Oressinoma is a Neotropical genus of butterflies in the family Nymphalidae.

Species
Oressinoma sorata Godman & Salvin, 1868
Oressinoma typhla Doubleday, [1849]

References

External links
Butterflies of the Andes
Images representing Oressinoma  at Encyclopedia of Life

Satyrini
Nymphalidae of South America
Nymphalidae genera
Taxa named by Edward Doubleday